The Great Wall Marathon is an annual marathon race, traditionally held on the third Saturday of May along and on the Huangyaguan or Huangya Pass, Tianjin section of the Great Wall of China, East of Beijing. Since it first started in 1999, the race has grown to several hundred participants. A locally organized event offering a full selection of runs including a full marathon (42.2k), half marathon (21.1k), 10k, and 5k distances. Aside from the main marathon, a half marathon, 10 km and 5 km runs were also held until 2012. 2013 marked the debut of an 8.5 km "fun run", replacing the 5 and 10 km distances. The course is much tougher than traditional marathons with participants challenged by 5,164 stone steps and many steep ascents and descents.

The first and longest running international marathon whose course is entirely on the Great Wall of China. The course traverses through the Simatai, a section of the Great Wall of China located in the north of Miyun District, 120 km northeast of Beijing, and Jinshanling, a section of the Great Wall of China located in the mountainous area in Luanping County, 125 km northeast of Beijing.

Running conditions 
Considered as one of the most challenging adventure marathons due to the extreme course conditions. Containing more than 20,000 unrelenting stone steps, many vary in height from a few centimeters to over 40 cm in height, with many of the original sections little more than rubble, and no less than 30 km of running experience on one of the oldest and most recognizable structures in the world.

Although a small portion of the Great Wall on the course has been restored, much of the Great Wall is still in its original state and in ruins. Runners will encounter loose stones, gravel, missing steps, and crumbling walls along with sections taken over by nature with trees and plant life. Runners must use extreme caution as there are sections of the race course where you must exit the Great Wall and run on the trail alongside the wall to avoid extreme hazards. Runners should be physically fit and in shape as this marathon can be extremely strenuous. Each section of the course will offer different challenges. It is suggested to train to help condition your body to prepare for the race.

Course elevation 
The Great Wall of China Marathon course varies in height by around 200m (about 650 feet) between the start line and the highest point at East Tower 20.
Stone guard towers are spread along the length of the wall, each some 200m to 300m apart. Stone steps and walkways, following the up and down contours of the ground, connect the towers.

The effect this creates for runners is similar to interval training, with an effort required to climb up, followed by a recovery period coming down. Regular training on steps as part of your preparations for the Great Wall is highly recommended.

Time limits 
There is a 10-hour time limit for all races, start time is approximately 6:00 AM with a 4:00 PM cut-off time. Participants must maintain a pace faster than the course time limits in order to complete the race.

Winners
Key:

Previous editions

2003 
2003, Albatros Adventure Marathons cancel The Great Wall Marathon due to the SARS epidemic.

2007 
The winner was Salvador Calvo, whose time of 3:23:10 broke the previous course record by four minutes.

2008 
Saturday May 17, 2008: Again, the previous race record was broken, this time by Great Wall Marathon first-timer Romualdo Sanchez Garita from Mexico. His finish time was 3:18:48. The fastest woman in the field was South African Leanne Juul, who finished in 4:09:10.

2009 
Saturday May 16, 2009: There were 1,363 runners in the four distances. More than 40 countries were represented.

2010 
Saturday May 15, 2010: A record number of 1,748 participants from around the world ran the four distances.

2011 
Saturday May 21, 2011

2012 
Saturday May 18, 2012

2013 
Saturday May 18, 2013: The fastest runners in the marathon were:
Jorge Maravilla (USA), Dimitris Theodorakakos (Greece) and Jonathan Wyatt (New Zealand) who crossed the finish line together in record time, 3:09:18
Silvia Serafini, Italy, 3:32:12 (a new women's record)

The half-marathon was won by Geoffrey de Bilderling with a time of 1 hour 38 minutes 56 seconds.

2014 
Saturday May 17, 2014

2015 

The 2015 race was held on Saturday, 16 May.

2019 

The 2019 race was held on Saturday, 18 May.

2020 
The 2020 edition of the race was cancelled due to the coronavirus pandemic.

2021 
The 2021 edition of the race was cancelled due to the coronavirus pandemic.

2022 
The 2022 edition of the race was cancelled due to the coronavirus pandemic.

References

External links 
Official website Jinshanling
Official website which includes previous results
Official website Huangyaguan
 Official Spanish website
 Official China website

Marathons in China
Athletics in Beijing
Great Wall of China
Spring (season) events in China